A non-bonding electron is an electron not involved in chemical bonding. This can refer to:
Lone pair, with the electron localized on one atom.
Non-bonding orbital, with the electron delocalized throughout the molecule.

Chemical bonding